San Juan County is a county located in the U.S. state of Colorado. As of the 2020 census, the population was 705, making it the least populous county in Colorado. The county seat and the only incorporated municipality in the county is Silverton. The county name is the Spanish language name for "Saint John", the name Spanish explorers gave to a river and the mountain range in the area.

History 
Long before European settlement, the area was regularly explored by the Anasazi, and later the Utes, who hunted and lived in the San Juans during the summer. There is also speculation that Spanish explorers and fur traders ventured into the area in the 1600s and 1700s.

Permanent settlement in the area surrounding present-day San Juan County began in 1860, near the end of the Colorado Gold Rush. These first settlers were a group of prospectors lead by Charles Baker, who made their way into the San Juan Mountains searching for gold.

After the Brunot Agreement with the Utes in 1873, which exchanged  for the Southern Ute Indian Reservation and $25,000 per year, several mining camps were constructed. These would later become the communities of Howardsville, Eureka, and Silverton. San Juan County was formed on January 31, 1876, from part of La Plata County.

The region boomed after George Howard and R. J. McNutt discovered the Sunnyside silver vein along Hurricane Peak, outside the mining camp of Eureka. Gold was then discovered in 1882, which helped the county weather the Panic of 1893 far better than other mining communities, such as Aspen or Creede. The Sunnyside Mine would become one of Colorado's longest running and most productive mines.

Mining operators in the San Juan mountain area of Colorado formed the San Juan District Mining Association (SJDMA) in 1903, as a direct result of a Western Federation of Miners proposal to the Telluride Mining Association for the eight-hour day, which had been approved in a referendum by 72 percent of Colorado voters. The new association consolidated the power of thirty-six mining properties in San Miguel, Ouray, and San Juan Counties. The SJDMA refused to consider any reduction in hours or increase in wages, helping to provoke a bitter strike.

The Sunnyside mine was shut down after the 1929 stock market crash, but was acquired by Standard Metals Corp. in 1959, and reopened, finding gold in 1973 with the Little Mary vein. The county's economy was dealt a devastating blow in 1992 when the mine and the corresponding Shenandoah-Dives mill, the last operating in the region, permanently closed. The closure meant the end of jobs for over one third of the county's workforce.

Geography 
It is the fifth-smallest county in Colorado by area. The county is located in the heart of the San Juan Mountains of Colorado.

Adjacent counties 
 Ouray County – north
 Hinsdale County – east
 La Plata County – south
 Montezuma County – southwest
 Dolores County – west
 San Miguel County – northwest

Major Highways 
  U.S. Highway 550

National protected areas 
 Durango-Silverton Narrow-Gauge Railroad National Historic District
 Rio Grande National Forest
 San Juan National Forest
 Shenandoah-Dives (Mayflower) Mill
 Silverton National Historic District
 Uncompahgre National Forest
 Weminuche Wilderness

Trails and byways 
 Alpine Loop National Back Country Byway
 Colorado Trail
 Continental Divide National Scenic Trail
 San Juan Skyway National Scenic Byway

Demographics 

As of the census of 2000, there were 558 people, 269 households, and 157 families residing in the county. The population density was one person per square mile (1/km2). There were 632 housing units at an average density of 2 per square mile (1/km2). The racial makeup of the county was 97.13% White, 0.72% Native American, 0.18% Asian, 0.36% Pacific Islander, 0.72% from other races, and 0.90% from two or more races. 7.35% of the population were Hispanic or Latino of any race.

There were 269 households, out of which 23.80% had children under the age of 18 living with them, 43.90% were married couples living together, 8.90% had a female householder with no husband present, and 41.30% were non-families. 36.80% of all households were made up of individuals, and 4.80% had someone living alone who was 65 years of age or older. The average household size was 2.06 and the average family size was 2.63.

In the county, the population was spread out, with 20.10% under the age of 18, 4.30% from 18 to 24, 28.10% from 25 to 44, 40.50% from 45 to 64, and 7.00% who were 65 years of age or older. The median age was 44 years. For every 100 females, there were 110.60 males. For every 100 females age 18 and over, there were 112.40 males.

The median income for a household in the county was $30,764, and the median income for a family was $40,000. Males had a median income of $30,588 versus $19,545 for females. The per capita income for the county was $17,584. About 13.50% of families and 20.90% of the population were below the poverty line, including 29.40% of those under age 18 and 7.10% of those age 65 or over.

San Juan county is the only county outside Alaska where walking is the most common form of commute to work. As of 2013, 33% of residents walked to work, 18% drove alone, 19% carpooled, and 18% bicycled, though the small population size introduces considerable margins of error to these statistics.

As of November 2006, the one and only local school had 53 students in grades K–12.

Communities

Town 
 Silverton

Unincorporated Communities 
 Howardsville
 Middleton
 Needleton

Former communities 
 Animas Forks (restored ghost town)
 Eureka (ghost town)

Politics 
In the era of William Jennings Bryan, San Juan County strongly favored the Democratic Party: no Republican managed to carry the county between 1892 and 1916, and it was even one of the few northern or western counties to vote for Alton B. Parker in 1904. It remained a Democratic-leaning county until the 1960s but then turned towards the Republican Party in subsequent decades. No Democratic presidential nominee won San Juan County between 1968 and 2000, although it was one of fifteen rural or remote counties to give a plurality to Ross Perot in 1992. Since John Kerry carried the county for his party for the first time in four decades at the 2004 election, San Juan County has voted Democratic at the last five Presidential elections.

See also 

 Outline of Colorado
 Index of Colorado-related articles
 National Register of Historic Places listings in San Juan County, Colorado

References

External links 

 
 Joint Town/County Planning Department
 Silverton Chamber of Commerce
 Colorado County Evolution by Don Stanwyck
 Colorado Historical Society

 
Colorado counties
1876 establishments in Colorado Territory
Populated places established in 1876